Unknown Mortal Orchestra (UMO) is a New Zealand psychedelic rock band formed in Auckland, primarily composed of singer, guitarist, and songwriter Ruban Nielson, and bassist Jacob Portrait. The band is currently based in Portland, Oregon, United States. Nielson started the band in 2010. The band's first album was released in 2011 on Fat Possum Records; four subsequent studio albums have been released on Jagjaguwar, the most recent being V (2023).

History

Inception
Singer and guitarist Ruban Nielson released the track "Ffunny Ffriends" on his anonymous Bandcamp profile on 17 May 2010. No further information was provided and notably, no mention of who created it. Within a day, the song had received significant coverage from independent music blogs such as Pitchfork. Through their reposting and attempts to hunt down the creator, Nielson eventually claimed the track as Unknown Mortal Orchestra's.

Unknown Mortal Orchestra

The band's debut self-titled album was released 21 June 2011 on Fat Possum Records. The album quickly received critical acclaim. Ruban promoted a 'Kiwi Edition' of the album on his Instagram, which includes a bonus track. Pitchfork gave the album an 8.1, describing that with "an expert use of space rare for such a lo-fi record, UMO manages a unique immersive and psychedelic quality without relying on the usual array of bong-ripping effects."

In the spring of 2012, the band won the Taite Music Prize for the album. Although the nominated Unknown Mortal Orchestra did not win Best Alternative Album, Nielson took home the title of Best Male Artist at the 47th annual Vodafone New Zealand Music Awards.

II

In September 2012, Unknown Mortal Orchestra announced that they had signed to Jagjaguwar and were working on their second full-length album. Unknown Mortal Orchestra's second album, II, was released on 5 February 2013. The first single from the album, entitled "Swim and Sleep (Like a Shark)", was first available as a 7" on their tour with Grizzly Bear.

II has received widespread critical acclaim. In November 2013 it won Best Alternative Album at the New Zealand Music Awards. II was nominated for the Taite Music Prize 2014, an annual music prize awarded for the best album from New Zealand. Clash Music gave the album a 9 out of 10, saying "from opener 'From The Sun', which recalls George Harrison-psychedelia, to the tender Family Stone shuffle of the closing of 'Secret Xtians', 'II' displays both a glowing warmth in its production and a deft use of space that illuminate Nielson's superbly crafted compositions." Paste magazine called the album "a modern, beat-heavy take on '60s psych, with plenty of hooks and fuzz to get you hooked and feeling fuzzy." NME praised Ruban's ability to turn his songs into "works of warm, fuzzy beauty."

During the winter of 2012, Unknown Mortal Orchestra capitalized on the success of II and embarked on a world tour. The tour started off with shows in Australia, and hometown shows in New Zealand, followed by several stops in Europe. The band then toured extensively throughout North America with opener Foxygen. In March 2013, Unknown Mortal Orchestra was named one of Fuse TV's 30 must-see artists at SXSW. Unknown Mortal Orchestra consistently sold out shows in both the UK/Europe and in North America, and as a result of their success on the road they announced in early April that they would extend their tour through the end of 2013. That summer the band performed at a number of major European festivals, including Roskilde Festival, Pukkelpop and Lowlands.

On 25 February 2013, Unknown Mortal Orchestra made their American television debut, performing "So Good At Being in Trouble" on Late Night with Jimmy Fallon.

On 29 October 2013, the band released an EP titled Blue Record. It included three acoustic versions of songs taken from their previous album.

Multi-Love

On 5 February 2015, the band announced their third studio album, Multi-Love. Soon after, they released the title track as the first single, which was designated "Best New Track" by Pitchfork. Multi-Love was released on 26 May 2015. It was well received by critics. Rolling Stone commented that "Multi-Love sees Nielson coloring outside the lines for a vibrant vision of connection"  and Pitchfork praised Nielson's ear for how something should sound and referred to the album as his "most accomplished." Singles "Multi-Love" and "Can't Keep Checking My Phone" were both A-listed at BBC's 6 Music.

Following the release, UMO embarked on a tour through the UK, Europe, the US and Canada, with many sold out dates. On 12 August, UMO performed Multi-Love on Late Night with Seth Meyers. On 25 August they performed "Can't Keep Checking My Phone" on Conan. On 16 February 2016 the band performed on Last Call with Carson Daly. "Can't Keep Checking My Phone" also appears in the association football video game FIFA 16.

Sex & Food and IC-01 Hanoi

The band's fourth studio album, Sex & Food, was released on 6 April 2018, garnering a lot of praise from fans and critics.

In a review on Reflektor Magazine the following was said, "The consistent thread through the UMO catalog remains strong; frontman Ruban Nielson spins a soulful vocal over a backdrop of melodically rich music and slick rhythm. This album builds on many of the synthesizers and sampled drum textures introduced on the previous breakout LP Multi-Love in 2015, but offers a different ride. The entire album was covertly previewed in SB-05, the 2017 installment of a Christmas day instrumental/ambient track released digitally for free. Upon first listen, Sex & Food reveals each song in its full form, a pleasant surprise." In July, the BBC Radio & 6Music named Sex & Food one of the best albums released in 2018.

Following the release, the band set out on a global tour with stops in North America, Europe, UK, Asia, New Zealand and Australia, with many sold out dates. In September 2018, they announced the release of an instrumental album that originated from the sessions for Sex & Food, titled IC-01 Hanoi. It was released on 26 October 2018.

V 

On 25 June 2021 the band released "Weekend Run", its first proper single since 2018's Sex & Food. The song was released via the band's long time label Jagjaguwar. Of the new song, Ruban Nielson said "At the end of the day I don't take for granted that I have the perfect job -- I truly work to make music that will set someone's day right and I think that shines through on 'Weekend Run.'" Later on 4 August, they released a second single "That Life".

On 25 October 2022, the band announced a 2023 US/UK tour in support of a forthcoming double album and released the single "I Killed Captain Cook". On 2 February 2023, the band announced the double album V, which was released on 17 March 2023 via Jagjaguwar, and released the single "Layla". On 21 February, “Nadja”, the fifth single from V was released.

Members

Current
Ruban Nielson – lead vocals, guitar, drums, bass, piano, keyboards, synthesizers (2010–present)
Jacob Portrait – bass, synths, backing vocals (2010–present)
Kody Nielson – drums, percussion, synths, backing vocals (2018–present; studio only 2013–present) 
Touring
Quincy McCrary – keyboards, synths, backing vocals (2015–2018; 2019)
Chris Nielson – keyboards, synths, saxophone, backing vocals (2018–present)

Former
Julien Ehrlich – drums (2010–2012)
Gregory Rogove – drums, backing vocals (2012–2013)
Riley Geare – drums, backing vocals (2013–2017)
Amber Baker – drums (2017–2018)
Thomas "Mabus" Hoganson – keyboards, synths, backing vocals (2018)

Discography

Studio albums

Instrumental albums

Extended plays
 SB-01 (2013)
 Blue Record (2013)
 SB-02 (2014)
 SB-03 (2015)
 SB-04 (2016)
 SB-05 (2017)
 SB-06 (2019)
 SB-07 (2019)
 SB-08 (2020)
 SB-09 (2021)
 SB-10 (2023)

Singles

Other charted songs

As featured artist

Awards and nominations

! Ref.
|-
| style="text-align:center;" | 2012
| Unknown Mortal Orchestra
| Taite Prize, Independent Music New Zealand
| 
| style="text-align:center;" | 
|-
| style="text-align:center;" rowspan="2"| 2013
| II
| Album of the Year, New Zealand Music Awards
| 
| style="text-align:center;" | 
|-
| "So Good at Being in Trouble"
| Single of the Year, New Zealand Music Awards
| 
| style="text-align:center;" | 
|-
| style="text-align:center;" rowspan="3"| 2015
| Ruban Nielson and Kody Nielson for "Multi-Love"
| APRA Silver Scroll
| 
| style="text-align:center;" | 
|-
| Multi-Love
| Best Alternative Album, New Zealand Music Awards
| 
| style="text-align:center;" | 
|-
| "Multi-Love"
| Best Single, New Zealand Music Awards
| 
| style="text-align:center;" | 
|-
| style="text-align:center;" | 2016
| Multi-Love
| Taite Prize, Independent Music New Zealand
| 
| style="text-align:center;" | 
|-
| style="text-align:center;" | 2019
| Sex & Food
| Best Foreign Album, Sweden GAFFA Awards
| 
| style="text-align:center;" |
|}

Notes

References

External links

 

APRA Award winners
Fat Possum Records artists
Indie rock musical groups from Oregon
Musical groups from Portland, Oregon
New Zealand indie rock groups
Musical groups established in 2010
Jagjaguwar artists
Musical groups from Auckland
2010 establishments in New Zealand